Praseodymium(III) fluoride is an inorganic compound with the formula PrF3, being the most stable fluoride of praseodymium.

Production 
The reaction between praseodymium(III) nitrate and sodium fluoride will produce praseodymium(III) fluoride as a green crystalline solid:
 Pr(NO3)3 + 3 NaF → 3 NaNO3 + PrF3

See also
Praseodymium(III) chloride
Praseodymium(IV) fluoride

References 

Fluorides
Praseodymium compounds
Inorganic compounds
Lanthanide halides